John Patrick Coveney (June 10, 1880 – March 28, 1961) was a catcher in Major League Baseball. He played for the St. Louis Cardinals in 1903.

References

External links

1880 births
1961 deaths
Major League Baseball catchers
St. Louis Cardinals players
Minor league baseball managers
Baseball players from Massachusetts
Nashua (minor league baseball) players
Lawrence Colts players
New Bedford Whalers (baseball) players
San Antonio Bronchos players
Columbus Foxes players
Davenport Prodigals players
Columbia Commies players
Spartanburg Red Sox players
Durham Bulls players
Greensboro Patriots players